The men's discus throw event at the 2019 African Games was held on 26 August in Rabat.

Results

References

Discus
African Games